"Kenny Dies" is the thirteenth episode of the fifth season of the animated television series South Park, and the 78th episode of the series overall. "Kenny Dies" originally aired in the United States on December 5, 2001 on Comedy Central and in the United Kingdom on April 20, 2002 on Sky One. In the episode, Cartman comes across a truckload of fetuses he cannot sell thanks to a recent government ruling on stem cell research. When Kenny is diagnosed with a terminal illness, Cartman uses it to lobby Congress to restore stem cell research.

The episode was written and directed by series co-creator Trey Parker and is rated TV-MA in the United States, except on syndicated broadcasts and post-2017 reruns on Comedy Central, where the episode is instead rated TV-14. The gag of Kenny dying in almost every episode was dropped after this episode, and he did not reappear bodily until "Red Sleigh Down." This was the final appearance of the "4th Grade" title sequence, which was first seen in "4th Grade." On the DVD commentary for the episode, Parker and Matt Stone state that they had originally planned to kill Kyle off for a year, but decided to kill Kenny instead as they were running out of original ways to kill him.

Plot
The episode begins in an abortion clinic with a woman giving her permission for doctors to use her aborted fetus for stem cell research. However, the truck transporting the fetuses to a medical research facility is destroyed in an accident. Its cargo is noticed and subsequently stolen by Cartman (riding his bike and singing Sheena Easton's "Morning Train"), who intends to resell the fetuses for a tremendous profit. This goal leads him to call various institutions in the style of a fast-talking agent, with the famous recurring line, "you're breaking my balls here", finally landing a deal with a government organization. To his dismay, the government puts a ban on stem cell research immediately afterward.

Meanwhile, Kenny is diagnosed with what is presumably muscular dystrophy, and his friends and family are told that he will probably die. The boys are shocked and saddened by the news, but do everything they can to support him and keep him company during his stay in the hospital – all but Stan, who cannot bear to see Kenny dying and refuses to visit him. This marks one of the few episodes in which Kenny's friends mourn his death. Cartman, in the meantime, has a doctor explain to him how stem cells actually work, and learns that they might be used to help Kenny. Cartman also mentions using stem cells to duplicate a Shakey's Pizza restaurant, although the researcher advises him that lumber would be better suited for that task. Cartman gives a speech to the House of Representatives on behalf of stem cell research. He ultimately succeeds in getting the ban lifted by singing "Heat of the Moment" by Asia and begins visiting laboratories around the area to collect more fetuses, even convincing a woman to have an abortion.

Stan, with the supporting words of Chef, finally gets up the courage to come to visit Kenny in the hospital. Unfortunately, Kenny has died from the disease. On hearing that Kenny's last words were "Where's Stan?", he accuses himself of being Kenny's worst friend. During the funeral, Cartman bursts in and exclaims that a miracle has occurred. He drags Stan and Kyle away to show them how he has manipulated the stem cells from his aborted fetuses into building his very own Shakey's Pizza. Kyle realizes that Cartman had pretended to take Kenny's illness seriously in order to get the ban on stem cells lifted just so he could make a profit off them, therefore allowing him to make his own Shakey's Pizza. Kyle then proceeds to beat Cartman up, while Stan is relieved that Cartman was Kenny's worst friend instead of him.

Reception
Serene Dominic of the Detroit Metro Times called the scene where Cartman leads members of the United States Congress in a sing-along of "Heat of the Moment" as the "Greatest Cartoon Moment" in the career of the original four members of Asia. In an article for ESPN.com, Tim Kavanagh discussed stem cells and how they were used in the episode, writing, "This, as with many other important topics of our day, I learned from "South Park," specifically Episode 513, entitled 'Kenny Dies.'" In a review of the South Park season 5 DVD release, Choire Sicha of The New York Times gave a "not-so-surprising surprise ending alert" that "Kenny finally really dies" at the end of the episode. Alessandra Stanley of The New York Times cited the episode when noting that the political commentary on South Park, like The Simpsons and Freak Show, was genuinely "provocative" satire, unlike the "safer ... mainstream iconoclasm" of Saturday Night Live.

Home media
"Kenny Dies", along with the thirteen other episodes from South Park: the Complete Fifth Season, was released on a three-disc DVD set in the United States on February 22, 2005. The set includes brief audio commentaries by Parker and Stone for each episode.

References

Further reading

External links

 "Kenny Dies" Full episode at South Park Studios
 

Television episodes about abortion
South Park (season 5) episodes
Stem cell research
Television episodes about death